The Scharrena Stuttgart (SCHARRena Stuttgart official spelling) is a multi-purpose hall in Stuttgart's Bad Cannstatt district. The hall is located on the fairgrounds Neckar Park, is the Mercedes-Benz Arena affiliated, under Unterthürkheimer Kurve (stand of Mercedes-Benz Arena. Their capacity is a maximum of 2,019 seats. Since April 2011, the Hall home ground of women's volleyball national league Smart Alliance Stuttgart.

External links 
 arena website (german)

References

Multi-purpose stadiums in Germany
Buildings and structures in Stuttgart
Sport in Stuttgart
Sports venues in Baden-Württemberg